Eastlake is a surname. Notable people with the surname include:

Charles Eastlake (1836–1906), architect and furniture designer
Sir Charles Lock Eastlake (1793–1865), 19th-century English painter
Cyril Eastlake (1930–2007), New Zealand rugby league footballer
Darrell Eastlake (1942–2018), Australian sports commentator
Elizabeth Eastlake (1809–1893), British art critic and art historian
William Eastlake (1917–1997), American writer